Andriy Mostovyi (born 24 January 1988) is a Ukrainian professional footballer who plays as a midfielder.

Club

Desna Chernihiv 
In 2016, Mostovyi moved to Desna Chernihiv and was promoted to the Ukrainian Premier League for the 2017–18 season.

In the 2019–20 Ukrainian First League season, he helped the team to fourth place in league, qualifying for the Europa League third qualifying round.

On 24 September 2020 Andriy Mostovyi was included in the team of Desna Chernihiv against VfL Wolfsburg for the Europa League third qualifying round at the AOK Stadion.

On 4 October 2020 he scored a goal against Shakhtar Donetsk at the Chernihiv Stadium for the Ukrainian Premier League in the season 2020-21.

In 2021 he left the club due his contract ended with the club of Chernihiv with big surprise of the Desna Chernihiv. He become part of one of the most successful time of the club in the history. After that Volodymyr Levin, the president of Desna in an interview he explained the changes of the team and thank Monstovyi e other big players who left the club for the contribution to the team of Chernihiv for the last 3–4 years.

Hirnyk Kryvyi Rih
In June 2021 he moved to Hirnyk Kryvyi Rih, just promoted in Ukrainian First League. On 6 September 2021 he made his debut with the new club against Alians Lypova Dolyna in Ukrainian Premier League in the season 2021-22, replacing Dmytro Semenov at the 46 minute. On 20 February 2022 he played in the friendly match against Desna Chernihiv, his ex former club at the Asteria Football Center in Antalya.

Shevardeni-1906 Tbilisi (Loan)
At the beginning of April 2022, he moved in Georgia to Shevardeni-1906 Tbilisi on loan, in Erovnuli Liga 2. On 16 April 2022, he scored against Rustavi and on 21 April 2022 he scored against WIT Georgia in Erovnuli Liga 2 in the season 2022. On 5 May 2022, he scored against Shukura Kobuleti at the Chele Arena in Erovnuli Liga 2 for the season 2022. In June 2022 he return to Hirnyk Kryvyi Rih and the his contract with the club was ended.

National Team
In 2006, he was called up to play for the 23-man squad of the Ukraine U18.

Career statistics

Club

International

Honours
Desna Chernihiv
 Ukrainian First League: 2017–18

Zirka Kropyvnytskyi
 Ukrainian First League: 2015–16

Knyazha Shchaslyve
 Ukrainian Second League: 2007–08

Dnipro Cherkasy
 Ukrainian Second League: 2005–06

References

External links
From Official the website of kryvbas
 
 

1988 births
People from Obukhiv
Sportspeople from Kyiv Oblast
Living people
Ukrainian footballers
Association football midfielders
FC Dnipro Cherkasy players
FC Knyazha Shchaslyve players
FC Knyazha-2 Shchaslyve players
FC Lviv players
FC Lviv-2 players
FC Naftovyk-Ukrnafta Okhtyrka players
FC Zirka Kropyvnytskyi players
FC Desna Chernihiv players
FC Shevardeni-1906 Tbilisi players
Ukrainian Premier League players
Ukrainian First League players
Expatriate footballers in Georgia (country)
Ukrainian expatriate sportspeople in Georgia (country)
Expatriate footballers in Germany
Ukrainian expatriate sportspeople in Germany